The Temple of Olympian Zeus, also known as the Olympieion or Columns of the Olympian Zeus, is a  former colossal temple at the center of the Greek capital Athens. It was dedicated to "Olympian" Zeus, a name originating from his position as head of the Olympian gods. Construction began in the 6th century BC during the rule of the Athenian tyrants, who envisaged building the greatest temple in the ancient world, but it was not completed until the reign of the Roman Emperor Hadrian in the 2nd century AD, some 638 years after the project had begun. During the Roman period the temple, which included 104 colossal columns, was renowned as the largest temple in Greece and housed one of the largest cult statues in the ancient world.

The temple's glory was short-lived, as it fell into disuse after being pillaged during a barbarian invasion in 267 AD, just about a century after its completion. It was probably never repaired and was reduced to ruins thereafter. In the centuries after the fall of the Roman Empire, it was extensively quarried for building materials to supply building projects elsewhere in the city. Despite that, a substantial part of the temple remains today, notably sixteen of the original gigantic columns, and it continues to be part of a very important archaeological site of Greece.

History

Classical and Hellenistic periods

Its foundations were laid on the site of an ancient outdoor sanctuary dedicated to Zeus. An earlier temple had stood there, constructed by the tyrant Peisistratus around 550 BC. The building was demolished after the death of Peisistratos and the construction of a colossal new Temple of Olympian Zeus was begun around 520 BC by his sons, Hippias and Hipparchos. 
They sought to surpass two famous contemporary temples, the Heraion of Samos and the second Temple of Artemis at Ephesus. It was to be flanked by a double colonnade of eight columns across the front and back and twenty-one on the flanks, surrounding the cella. 

The work was abandoned when the tyranny was overthrown and Hippias was expelled in 510 BC. Only the platform and some elements of the columns had been completed by that point, and the temple remained in that state for 336 years. The temple was left unfinished during the years of Athenian democracy, apparently, because the Greeks thought it was hubris to build on such a scale. In his treatise Politics, Aristotle cited the temple as an example of how tyrannies engaged the populace in great works for the state (like a white elephant) and left them no time, energy or means to rebel.

It was not until 174 BC that the Seleucid king Antiochus IV Epiphanes, who presented himself as the earthly embodiment of Zeus, revived the project and placed the Roman architect Decimus Cossutius in charge. The design was changed to have three rows of eight columns across the front and back of the temple and a double row of twenty on the flanks, for a total of 104 columns. The building material was changed to the expensive but high-quality Pentelic marble and the order was changed from Doric to Corinthian, marking the first time that this order had been used on the exterior of a major temple. However, the project ground to a halt again in 164 BC with the death of Antiochus. The temple was still only half-finished by that stage.
    
Serious damage was inflicted on the partly built temple by Lucius Cornelius Sulla's sack of Athens in 86 BC. While looting the city, Sulla seized some of the incomplete columns and transported them to Rome, where they were re-used in the Temple of Jupiter on the Capitoline Hill. A half-hearted attempt was made to complete the temple during Augustus' reign as the first Roman emperor, but it was not until the accession of Hadrian in the 2nd century AD that the project was finally completed around 638 years after it had begun.

Roman era
In 124–125 AD, when the strongly Philhellene Hadrian visited Athens, a massive building programme was begun that included the completion of the Temple of Olympian Zeus. A walled marble-paved precinct was constructed around the temple, making it a central focus of the ancient city. Cossutius' design was used with few changes and the temple was formally dedicated by Hadrian in 132, who took the title of "Panhellenios" in commemoration of the occasion.  The temple and the surrounding precinct were adorned with numerous statues depicting Hadrian, the gods, and personifications of the Roman provinces.  A colossal statue of Hadrian was raised behind the building by the people of Athens in honor of the emperor's generosity. An equally colossal chryselephantine statue of Zeus occupied the cella of the temple. The statue's form of construction was unusual, as the use of chryselephantine was by this time regarded as archaic. It has been suggested that Hadrian was deliberately imitating Phidias' famous statue of Athena Parthenos in the Parthenon, seeking to draw attention to the temple and himself by doing so.

Pausanias describes the temple as it was in the 2nd century: 
Before the entrance to the sanctuary of Zeus Olympios [in Athens] – Hadrian the Roman emperor dedicated the temple and the statue, one worth seeing, which in size exceeds all other statues save the colossi at Rhodes and Rome, and is made of ivory and gold with an artistic skill which is remarkable when the size is taken into account – before the entrance, I say, stand statues of Hadrian, two of Thasian stone, two of Egyptian. Before the pillars stand bronze statues which the Athenians call ‘colonies.’ The whole circumference of the precincts is about four states, and they are full of statues; for every city has dedicated a likeness of the emperor Hadrian, and the Athenians have surpassed them in dedicating, behind the temple, the remarkable colossus. Within the precincts are antiquities: a bronze Zeus, a temple of Kronos and Rhea and an enclosure of Gaia (Earth) surnamed Olympias. Here the floor opens to the width of a cubit, and they say that along this bed flowed off the water after the deluge that occurred in the time of [the mythical king] Deukalion, and into it, they cast every year wheat meal mixed with honey. On a pillar is a statue of Isokrates . . . There are also statues in Phrygian marble of Persians supporting a bronze tripod; both the figures and the tripod are worth seeing. The ancient sanctuary of Zeus Olympios the Athenians say was built by Deukalion, and they cite as evidence that Deukalion lived at Athens a grave which is not far from the present temple. Hadrian constructed other buildings also for the Athenians: a temple of Hera and Zeus Panellenios (Common to all Greeks).

The Temple of Olympian Zeus was badly damaged during the sack of Athens by the Heruli in 267 AD. It is unlikely to have been repaired, given the extent of the damage to the rest of the city. Assuming that it was not abandoned it would certainly have been closed down in 425 by the Christian Emperor Theodosius II, when he prohibited the worship of the old Roman and Greek gods during the persecution of pagans in the late Roman Empire. Material from the (presumably now ruined) building was incorporated into a basilica constructed nearby during the 5th or 6th century.

Medieval and Modern periods

Over the following centuries, the temple was systematically quarried to provide building materials and material for the houses and churches of medieval Athens. By the end of the Byzantine period, it had been almost totally destroyed; when Ciriaco de' Pizzicolli (Cyriacus of Ancona) visited Athens in 1436 he found only 21 of the original 104 columns still standing. 

The fate of one of the columns is recorded by a Greek inscription on one of the surviving columns, which states that "on 27 April 1759 he pulled down the column". This refers to the Turkish governor of Athens, Mustapha Agha Tzistarakis, who is recorded by a chronicler as having "destroyed one of Hadrian's columns with gunpowder" in order to re-use the marble to make plaster for the Tzistarakis Mosque that he was building in the Monastiraki district of the city. During the Ottoman period the temple was known to the Greeks as the Palace of Hadrian, while the Turks called it the Palace of Belkis, from a Turkish legend that the temple had been the residence of Solomon's wife.

Fifteen columns remain standing today and a sixteenth column lies on the ground where it fell during a storm in 1852. Nothing remains of the cella or the great statue that it once housed.

Excavation
The temple was excavated in 1889–1896 by Francis Penrose of the British School in Athens (who also played a leading role in the restoration of the Parthenon), in 1922 by the German archaeologist Gabriel Welter and in the 1960s by Greek archaeologists led by Ioannes Travlos. The temple, along with the surrounding ruins of other ancient structures, is a historical precinct administered by Ephorate of Antiquities of the Greek Interior Ministry.

Present

Today, the temple is an open-air museum, part of the unification of the archaeological sites of Athens. As a historical site it is protected and supervised by the Ephorate of Antiquities.

Ellinais 2007
On 21 January 2007, a group of Greek pagans held a ceremony honoring Zeus on the grounds of the temple. The event was organized by Ellinais, an organization which won a court battle to obtain recognition for Ancient Greek religious practices in the fall of 2006.

Mythodea 2001
On June 28, 2001, Vangelis organized the Mythodea Chorus at the Temple of Olympian Zeus in the context of NASA's Mars mission. Sopranos Jessie Norman and Kathleen Battle participated in the concert which was covered by 20 television networks from America, Australia, Canada, Japan and European countries, under the direction of Irish filmmaker Declan Lowney. The chorus arrangement brought thousands of people inside the Olympic venues, and outside the temple, into the empty streets of Athens. Joining Norman and Battle were the London Metropolitan Orchestra and the Greek National Opera, as well as over a hundred people dressed in ancient Greek clothing. The screen mounted at the Olympia connected visual images of ancient Greek performances - vases, frescoes and statues - that invested music with images of the planet Mars.

See also
List of Ancient Greek temples
 Architecture of Ancient Greece

Notes

References
 Darling, Janina K. Architecture of Greece. pp. 201–203. Greenwood Press, 2004. .

External links

Hellenic Ministry of Culture: Temple of Olympian Zeus website
Temple of Zeus: photo album and description
Temple of Zeus photos

Temple of Olympian Zeus: Description in English, Photos, Opening Hours, Ticket prices

2nd-century religious buildings and structures
Hadrianic building projects
Landmarks in Athens
Ancient Greek buildings and structures in Athens
Ancient Greek culture
Unfinished buildings and structures
Temples in ancient Athens
Athens
6th-century BC religious buildings and structures
Ruins in Greece